Free Your Mind is a seven-track EP by American rock band Anarbor released in 2009.

Track listing

Popular media use
"You and I" is used in Scooby-Doo! The Mystery Begins and a music video was filmed.  It was shown on Cartoon Network.
"The Brightest Green" has a music video.

References

2009 EPs
Anarbor albums
Hopeless Records EPs